The Chrysis Painter was an anonymous ancient Greek red-figure vase painter who worked in Athens around 420–410 BC. He is identified by his name vase, a hydria now kept in the Metropolitan Museum of Art in New York (accession number 06.1021.185).
 which has the name "Chrysis" inscribed next to the figure of a woman. He has been described as belonging to the school of the Dinos Painter.

A total of five pieces have been ascribed to the Chrysis Painter. Another of them is kept in the British Museum in London (vase E503).

References 

Ancient Greek vase painters
Artists of ancient Attica